An auxiliary bishop is a bishop assigned to assist the diocesan bishop in meeting the pastoral and administrative needs of the diocese. Auxiliary bishops can also be titular bishops of sees that no longer exist as territorial jurisdictions.

Roman Catholicism 
In the Catholic Church, auxiliary bishops exist in both the Latin Church and in the Eastern Catholic Churches. The particular duties of an auxiliary bishop are given by the diocesan bishop and can vary widely depending on the auxiliary bishop, the ordinary, and the needs of the diocese. In a larger archdiocese, they might be assigned to serve a portion of the archdiocese (sometimes called deaneries, regions, or vicariates) or to serve a particular population such as immigrants or those of a particular heritage or language. Canon law requires that the diocesan bishop appoint each auxiliary bishop as vicar general or episcopal vicar of the diocese.

In May 2017, Gregorio Rosa Chávez was one of the first Roman Catholic auxiliary bishops to be appointed as cardinal. At that time, he was auxiliary bishop of José Luis Escobar Alas, the Archbishop of San Salvador (who was not elevated).

Eastern Orthodoxy 
In Eastern Orthodox Churches, auxiliary bishops are also called vicarian bishops or simply vicar bishops. In the Serbian Orthodox Church, the office of auxiliary (vicar) bishop is entrusted to titular bishops, who are assigned with assisting diocesan bishops in various aspects of diocesan administration. The Greek word protosyncellus defines an auxiliary bishop who has been elevated to the dignity of vicarian of another titular bishop, and who is assigned to assist and act on behalf of his episcopal authority over the jurisdiction of the episcopal see. For example, Teodosije Šibalić (titular bishop of Lipljan) was appointed auxiliary bishop to the Eparchy of Raška and Prizren in 2004.

References

External links 
 USCCB – Appointing Bishops
 Archdiocese of Indianapolis – "What does an auxiliary bishop do?"

Bishops by type
Catholic ecclesiastical titles
Episcopacy in the Catholic Church
Episcopacy in Eastern Orthodoxy